Technology is the third studio album by English four-piece rock band Don Broco. It was released on 2 February 2018 through American label SharpTone Records.

Release
On 24 June 2016, the band officially signed with SharpTone Records, which was co-founded by Shawn Keith and Nuclear Blast CEO Markus Staiger.

Don Broco released the single "Everybody" on 29 July 2016, along with an accompanying music video.

Prior to the release of Technology Don Broco released five more singles: "Pretty", "Technology", "Stay Ignorant", "T-Shirt Song" and "Come Out to LA" with accompanying music videos.

Prior to the release of the album, the band performed a single sold-out date in the UK at London's Alexandra Palace 11 November 2017, their biggest show to date.

Track listing

Personnel
Credits taken from Technology's liner notes.

Don Broco
 Rob Damiani – lead vocals, electronics
 Simon Delaney – lead and rhythm guitars
 Matt Donnelly – drums, percussion, electronic beats, backing vocals, co-lead vocals on "Come Out to LA"
 Tom Doyle – bass guitar

Other personnel
 Jason Perry – production
 Dan Lancaster – production
 drew BANG – engineering
 Romesh Dodangoda – production

Charts

Certifications

References

2018 albums
Don Broco albums
SharpTone Records albums
Albums produced by Jason Perry